The Municipal District of Pincher Creek No. 9 is a municipal district (MD) in southwestern Alberta, Canada. Located in Census Division No. 3, its municipal office is located in the Town of Pincher Creek.

History 
The MD of Pincher Creek No. 9 was originally renamed from the MD of Crowsnest No. 39 to the MD of Pincher Creek No. 39 in 1944. It was renumbered a year later in 1945.

Geography

Communities and localities 
 
The following urban municipalities are surrounded by the MD of Pincher Creek No. 9.
Cities
none
Towns
Pincher Creek
Villages
Cowley
Summer villages
none

The following hamlets are located within the MD of Pincher Creek No. 9.
Hamlets
Beaver Mines
Lowland Heights
Lundbreck
Pincher Station
Twin Butte

The following localities are located within the MD of Pincher Creek No. 9.
Localities 
Burmis
Chapel Rock
Drywood
Improvement District No. 40
Maycroft
North Fork
Pecten
Springridge
Summerview
Tod Creek

Demographics 

In the 2016 Census of Population conducted by Statistics Canada, the MD of Pincher Creek No. 9 had a population of 2,965 living in 1,119 of its 1,640 total private dwellings, a  change from its 2011 population of 3,158.

See also 
List of communities in Alberta
List of municipal districts in Alberta

References

External links 

 
Pincher Creek